Normania may refer to:

Places
Normania, Minnesota, unincorporated community, United States
Normania Township, Yellow Medicine County, Minnesota, United States
Normania Township, Benson County, North Dakota, United States

Plants
Solanum, a genus of plants which includes the potato and tomato; Normania is a synonym and a proposed section of Solanum

See also
Normannia (disambiguation)
Normani (born 1996), American singer, songwriter and dancer